Yariv reagent (1,3,5-tri(p-glycosyloxyphenylazo)-2,4,6-trihydroxybenzene) is a glycosylated phenolic compound that binds strongly to galactans and arabinogalactan proteins. It can therefore be used in their detection, quantification, precipitation, isolation, staining, and interfere with their function. It was initially synthesised in 1962 as an antigen for carbohydrate-binding antibodies but has subsequently become more broadly used. There are many variants of Yariv reagents which vary in the glycosyl groups on the outside of the structure, typically glucose, galactose, and mannose.

A biographical article about Joseph Yariv was published by the Journal of Applied Crystallography.

References 

Azo compounds
Glycosides